Carson Meier (born June 29, 1995) is an American football tight end who is a free agent. He played college football at Oklahoma.

College career
Meier was a member of the Oklahoma Sooners for five seasons, redshirting his true freshman season. He spent the next three seasons playing special teams and the H-back position, where he was used exclusively as a blocker. As a redshirt senior, Meier caught 19 receptions for 327 yards and four touchdowns and was named second-team All-Big 12 Conference by the league's coaches.

Professional career

Jacksonville Jaguars
Meier signed with the Jacksonville Jaguars as an undrafted free agent April 27, 2019. He was cut by the Jaguars at the end of training camp.

Atlanta Falcons
Meier was signed to the Atlanta Falcons practice squad on September 3, 2019. Meier was promoted to the Falcons' active roster on November 27. He made his NFL debut the next day, starting at tight end against the New Orleans Saints. He was waived on December 7, 2019. Meier was re-signed to the Falcons' practice squad on December 10, 2019. On December 30, 2019, Meier was signed to a reserve/future contract. He was waived with an injury settlement on August 14, 2020.

Miami Dolphins
On July 26, 2021, Meier signed with the Miami Dolphins. He was waived on August 16.

References

External links
Oklahoma Sooners bio
Atlanta Falcons bio

1995 births
Living people
American football tight ends
Oklahoma Sooners football players
Jacksonville Jaguars players
Atlanta Falcons players
Miami Dolphins players